The 1918 Bath by-election was held on 15 October 1918.  The by-election was held due to the death in action of the incumbent Conservative MP, Lord Alexander Thynne.  It was won by the Conservative candidate Charles Foxcroft who was unopposed.

References

1918 elections in the United Kingdom
1918 in England
20th century in Somerset
October 1918 events
Politics of Bath, Somerset
By-elections to the Parliament of the United Kingdom in Somerset constituencies
Unopposed by-elections to the Parliament of the United Kingdom in English constituencies